Alexander Millar (born 29 July 1985) is a British professional poker player who specializes in online high-stakes heads-up cash games, specifically No Limit Hold'em, playing under the alias Kanu7 on PokerStars and IReadYrSoul on Full Tilt Poker.

Poker career
Millar specializes in online high-stakes No Limit Hold'em and rarely plays live tournaments. He has earned over $2,600,000 playing on PokerStars and over $1,800,000 playing on Full Tilt.

Millar had studied at Warwick University. He began playing freerolls and $5 tourneys for fun in his 3rd year. In the 4th year, he started to play low buy-in tourneys, SnGs and 50NL. During that year, Alex moved up from 50NL & 100NL to playing 2000NL & 5000NL. After that he decided to take poker as a career.

In 2013, Alex was signed as a part of PokerStars team pro. He resigned from his role stars ambassador in 2015.

Millar considers Doug Polk, Ben Sulsky, and Isaac Haxton to be his toughest opponents.

References

External links
Alexander Millar Hendon Mob Profile

American poker players
Living people
1985 births